Hyperoplus is a genus of sand lances native to the northeastern Atlantic Ocean.

Species
The currently recognized species in this genus are:
 Hyperoplus immaculatus (Corbin, 1950) (Corbin's sand eel)
 Hyperoplus lanceolatus (Le Sauvage, 1824) (great sand eel)

References

Ammodytidae
Marine fish genera
Taxa named by Albert Günther